American Immigration Policy: A Reappraisal is a 1950 book edited by William S. Bernard, Carolyn Zeleny, and Henry Miller. It was published by Harper & Bros under the sponsorship of the National Committee on Immigration Policy. The book was the subject of reviews in several academic journals.

References

1950 non-fiction books
Harper & Brothers books